Frederick Thomas Smye (July 4, 1868 – November 15, 1930) was an Ontario political figure. He represented Hamilton West in the Legislative Assembly of Ontario from 1926 to 1930 as a Conservative member.

He was born in Hamilton, Ontario, the son of William Smye, an Irish immigrant, and was educated there. In 1898, he married Maude Givern. He served as Minister Without Portfolio in the provincial cabinet from 1929 to 1930. He died on November 15, 1930.

His son Frederick Thomas Smye, Jr. was later president of Avro Aircraft Limited.

References 

 Canadian Parliamentary Guide, 1928, AL Normandin

External links 
 Member's parliamentary history for the Legislative Assembly of Ontario

1868 births
1930 deaths
Progressive Conservative Party of Ontario MPPs